Inquisitor mastersi is a species of sea snail, a marine gastropod mollusk in the family Pseudomelatomidae.

Taxonomy
Wells (1994) excluded mastersi from Inquisitor, but did not suggest an alternative generic allocation. It is thus here kept provisionally in Inquisitor

Description
The reddish brown, solid shell is ovate and depressly flattened at the upper part. It contains 8, transversely sculptured, whorls. The centre of the upper whorls is tuberculated, spotted with white, the last longitudinally rather obliquely ribbed. At the angle they become more like prickly nodules, below somewhat white. The suture is minutely spirally striated. The outer lip is simple, brownish in centre, having an obsolete white sinus below. The upper sinus is white, deep, and wide, with a thick deposit of callus on the body whorl, and extending down in a thin plate to the columellar. The siphonal canal is very short and wide. (described as Drillia mastersi Brazier, 1876).

Distribution
This marine species is endemic to Australia and occurs off Northern Territory, Queensland.

References

 Brazier, J. 1876. A list of the Pleurotomidae collected during the Chevert expedition, with the description of the new species. Proceedings of the Linnean Society of New South Wales 1: 151–162 
 Smith, E.A. 1888. Diagnoses of new species of Pleurotomidae in the British Museum. Annals and Magazine of Natural History 6 2: 300–317
 Hedley, C. 1908. Studies on Australian Mollusca. Part 10. Proceedings of the Linnean Society of New South Wales 33: 456–489

External links
  Hedley, C. 1922. A revision of the Australian Turridae. Records of the Australian Museum 13(6): 213–359, pls 42-56 
  Tucker, J.K. 2004 Catalog of recent and fossil turrids (Mollusca: Gastropoda). Zootaxa 682:1–1295

mastersi
Gastropods described in 1876
Gastropods of Australia
Taxa named by John Brazier